Bourbon County is a county located in the U.S. state of Kentucky. As of the 2020 census, the population was 20,252. Its county seat is Paris. Bourbon County is part of the Lexington–Fayette, KY Metropolitan Statistical Area. It is one of Kentucky's nine original counties, and is best known for its historical association with bourbon whiskey.

History

Old Bourbon
Bourbon County was established in 1785 from a portion of Fayette County, Virginia, and named after the French House of Bourbon, in gratitude for Louis XVI of France's assistance during the American Revolutionary War.

Bourbon County, Virginia, originally comprised 34 of Kentucky's 120 current ones, including the current Bourbon County. This larger area later became known as Old Bourbon. Bourbon became part of the new state of Kentucky when it was admitted to the Union in 1792.

Birthplace of Bourbon whiskey
Whiskey was an early product of the area, and whiskey barrels from the area were marked Old Bourbon when they were shipped downriver from the local port on the Ohio River.  As it was made mostly from corn (maize), it had a distinctive flavor, and the name bourbon came to be used to distinguish it from other regional whiskey styles, such as Monongahela, a product of western Pennsylvania, which may have generally been a rye whiskey. The use of the term Old in the phrase Old Bourbon, was likely misconstrued as a reference to the aging of the whiskey rather than part of the name of the geographic area. The port, originally known as Limestone, now Maysville, was in Bourbon County until the borders were redrawn in 1789 when it became part of the Mason County of Virginia, and it is now in Mason County, Kentucky. Thirty-four modern Kentucky counties were once part of the original Bourbon County, including the current county of that name.

Except for a few distilleries that were authorized to produce it for medicinal purposes, the bourbon industry was wiped out in 1919 when Prohibition took effect. Kentucky adopted prohibition a year earlier than the national prohibition.  Within the boundaries of Bourbon County as it stands today there were, by some counts, 26 distilleries.  All of these were shut down in 1919, and no distilleries resumed operation there until late 2014, a period of 95 years.  At present, alcohol production and sales in Kentucky are regulated by a patchwork of laws which the Kentucky Supreme Court called a "maze of obscure statutory language".

Courthouse 
The courthouse was destroyed by fire in 1872 and 1901, resulting in the loss of county records. The current courthouse is the county's fourth.

Geography

There are no sizable lakes in the county, although there are several streams.  Primary among these is Stoner Creek, on which the county seat is situated.  This large stream is a principal tributary of the South Fork of the Licking River.

The county's topography is predominantly gently rolling hills.  Due to agricultural development, very little of the county's land area can be characterized as forested, though deciduous trees are a common feature of the landscape.

Adjacent counties
 Harrison County  (northwest)
 Nicholas County  (northeast)
 Bath County  (east)
 Montgomery County  (southeast)
 Clark County  (south)
 Fayette County  (southwest)
 Scott County  (west)

Demographics

As to the census of 2010, there were 19,985 people and 8,128 households residing in the county. The racial makeup of the county was 90.38% White, 6.94% Black or African American, 0.15% Native American, 0.14% Asian, 0.01% Pacific Islander, 1.36% from other races, and 1.02% from two or more races.  2.60% of the population were Hispanic or Latino of any race.

There were 7,681 households, out of which 32.80% had children under the age of 18 living with them, 54.70% were married couples living together, 12.30% had a female householder with no husband present, and 29.10% were non-families. 24.80% of all households were made up of individuals, and 11.10% had someone living alone who was 65 years of age or older.  The average household size was 2.49 and the average family size was 2.95.

In the county, the population was spread out, with 25.00% under the age of 18, 8.10% from 18 to 24, 28.60% from 25 to 44, 24.70% from 45 to 64, and 13.60% who were 65 years of age or older.  The median age was 38 years. For every 100 females, there were 94.60 males.  For every 100 females age 18 and over, there were 91.00 males.

The median income for a household in the county was $35,038, and the median income for a family was $42,294. Males had a median income of $30,989 versus $23,467 for females. The per capita income for the county was $18,335.  About 12.30% of families and 14.00% of the population were below the poverty line, including 19.10% of those under age 18 and 11.90% of those age 65 or over.

Communities

 Cane Ridge
 Centerville
 Clintonville
 Little Rock
 Millersburg
 North Middletown
 Paris (county seat)
 Ruddles Mills

Politics
For most of the 20th century Bourbon county was a fairly reliable Democratic county. However, since the dawn of the 21st century it has now become a solidly Republican county.

Notable people
 Mitchell Dazey (1820–1896), Illinois politician and farmer; was born in Bourbon County.
 Mary Rootes Thornton McAboy (1815–1892), poet

See also

 Bourbon County, Kansas
 National Register of Historic Places listings in Bourbon County, Kentucky

References

 
Kentucky counties
Lexington–Fayette metropolitan area
1785 establishments in Virginia
Populated places established in 1785
Former counties of Virginia